The Cuevas–Bislig Road is a , two-lane national primary highway that connects the provinces of Agusan del Sur and Surigao del Sur. This highway also connects to the Maharlika Highway in Barangay Cuevas, Trento, Agusan del Sur. It lessens the travel time from the southern part of Agusan del Sur to Bislig in Surigao del Sur.

The highway forms part of National Route 73 (N73) of the Philippine highway network.

References 

Roads in Agusan del Sur
Roads in Surigao del Sur